This was the first edition of the tournament.

Elina Svitolina won the title, defeating Alizé Cornet in the final, 7–5, 6–4.

Seeds

Draw

Finals

Top half

Bottom half

Qualifying

Seeds

Qualifiers

Lucky loser

Qualifying draw

First qualifier

Second qualifier

Third qualifier

Fourth qualifier

References

External Links
Main Draw
Qualifying Draw

Chicago Women's Open - Singles
Tennis in Chicago
Women's sports in Illinois